Patrik, Age 1.5 is a 2008 Swedish comedy–drama film in which a gay Swedish couple adopt what they at first believe to be a baby, Patrik, only to have him turn out to be a homophobic teenager.

Plot
The film chronicles the experience of a gay Swedish couple, Sven (Torkel Petersson) and Göran Skoogh (Gustaf Skarsgård) as they move into a new suburban neighborhood and adopt a child, beginning with their welcoming party. After meeting their new neighbors and settling into their jobs, they decide to adopt a child. Although they are married, no country is willing to let a gay couple adopt any of its children. After initially being turned down by the adoption agency, a Swedish orphan becomes available, whom they readily agree to adopt. However, a typographical error on the papers changed the child's age from "15" to "1.5". When their new son Patrik (Tom Ljungman) arrives, they are shocked to find him a troubled teenager with a criminal background.

Hurrying to the adoption agency to rectify the error, they arrive to find there is nothing that can be done until the next week. Over the next few days, Sven is appalled by Patrik's insulting behavior, even though Göran sees the good in him. Patrik is initially fearful of both men, believing stereotypes that gays are pedophiles.  Once the agency reopens, all three are told by the officials that Patrik's only options are living with them or returning to the foster center where he came from. After living up to his troublemaking habits, Patrik causes Sven to leave in disgust over Göran's unwillingness to kick Patrik out. Göran agrees to look after Patrik until the agency can find a suitable home for him. Over the next few days, Patrik reveals his talent for gardening, and Göran grows to accept him.

After several weeks, the agency notifies Göran that a family has been found for Patrik, who by this time has gotten past his initial fear and contempt for his surrogate parents. Sven returns as he and Göran both realize their issues were not worth ending their relationship. Patrik's new father arrives to pick him up, and he leaves with him. After a short time, Patrik returns, and the three then live together permanently.

Cast
 Gustaf Skarsgård as Göran Skoogh 
 Torkel Petersson as Sven Skoogh 
 Tom Ljungman as Patrik 
 Anders Lönnbro as Urban Adler

Release

The film was shown at the 2008 Toronto International Film Festival and the 2009 London Lesbian and Gay Film Festival. It was screened to a sold-out cinema at the Seattle International Film Festival for the festival's annual "Gay-la" event. It is the opening night film at the 2009 Inside Out Film and Video Festival, and was a centerpiece film for Frameline in San Francisco in June 2009. It was the closing film at the Dublin Gay and Lesbian Film Festival (GAZE) in August 2009 and at the Glasgay! Film Festival in October 2009. Also screened at the Hong Kong Lesbian and Gay Film Festival and the Rehoboth Beach Film Festival (where it placed 3rd for Best Feature) in November 2009, and at the 25th Gay and Lesbian Film Festival in Ljubljana, Slovenia, in early December 2009, where a discussion was held with director Ella Lemhagen after the sold-out (closing) screening at the Slovenian Cinematheque.

Production
Patrik, Age 1.5 is technically based on a stage production; however, director Ella Lemhagen didn't like the script of the play all that much, and decided to just use the film's pitch and to build up a new story from scratch. While doing so, she interviewed the first Swedish gay couple given permission to adopt, in 2003, and who by 2010 were still waiting to actually adopt.

Reception
The film received generally positive reviews from critics. Based on 17 reviews, it holds a 71% "Fresh" rating on Rotten Tomatoes. Jeanette Causulis from The New York Times said in her review that "Deftly combining low-key romance and gentle humor, the director, Ella Lemhagen (working from Michael Druker's 2008 play), stares down prejudice with a nudge and a wink rather than a soapbox."

Kevin Thomas from the Los Angeles Times wrote "This most observant and involving film has three strengths: It shows that a strongly family-oriented, middle-class suburbia is initially hardly idyllic for gays; the arrival of Patrik reveals fissures in Sven and Goran’s relationship; and that Lemhagen, who plays against predictability at every turn, maintains suspense right up to the final minutes as to how everything may turn out for the three." Chuck Wilson from The Village Voice wrote “One is never bored, thanks to the innate charms of Gustaf Skarsgård and young Ljungman.”

Sources
 Review by Brent Hartinger in AfterElton: "If You See Only One Gay Indie Movie This Year, Make It Patrik, Age 1.5"

References

External links
 
 
 
 
 
 "It's a Wonderful Life…Isn't It?" a Bluefat review

2008 films
2008 comedy-drama films
Swedish comedy-drama films
2000s Swedish-language films
Swedish LGBT-related films
Swedish independent films
Here TV original programming
LGBT-related comedy-drama films
2008 LGBT-related films
American comedy-drama films
Films directed by Ella Lemhagen
Films about adoption
2008 independent films
2000s American films
2000s Swedish films